World War II in Yugoslav Macedonia started with the Axis invasion of Yugoslavia in April 1941. Under the pressure of the Yugoslav Partisan movement, part of the Macedonian communists began in October 1941 a political and military campaign to resist the occupation of Vardar Macedonia. Officially, the area was called then Vardar Banovina, because the very name Macedonia was prohibited in the Kingdom of Yugoslavia. It was occupied mostly by Bulgarian, but also by German, Italian, and Albanian forces.

Initially there was no organised resistance because the majority of the Macedonian Slavs were pro-Bulgarian oriented. It started to grow only in 1943 with the capitulation of Italy and the Soviet victories over Nazi Germany. The role of the Bulgarian communists, who avoided organizing mass armed resistance, was also a key factor. Their influence over the Macedonian Party organization remained dominant until 1943, when it became obvious that Germany and Bulgaria would be defeated.

At that time Tito's special emissary Svetozar Vukmanović arrived in Macedonia. Vukmanović had to activate the struggle and give it an ethnic Macedonian identity. This led to the rise of younger generation anti-Bulgarian oriented partisan leaders, who were loyal to Yugoslavia. They formed in 1943 the People's Liberation Army of Macedonia and the Macedonian Communist Party. In the western part of the area, the Albanian Partisans also participated in the resistance movement.

After Bulgaria switched sides in the war in September 1944, the Bulgarian 5th. Army stationed in Macedonia, moved back to the old borders of Bulgaria. In the early October the newly formed Bulgarian People's Army together with the Red Army reentered occupied Yugoslavia to blocking the German forces withdrawing from Greece. Yugoslav Macedonia was liberated in end of November when communist Yugoslavia was established. After the German retreat forced by the Bulgarian offensive, the conscription of Macedonians in the army increased significantly.

The operation was commonly called by the Yugoslav Marxist historiography the National Liberation War of Macedonia in Yugoslavia, similarly to the greater Yugoslav People's Liberation War. Some of the combatants also developed aspirations for independence of the region of Macedonia, but were suppressed at the end of the war by the communist authorities. It marked the defeat of Bulgarian nationalism and the victory of the pro-Yugoslav Macedonism in the area. As result the new Communist authorities persecuted the former collaborationists with the charges of "Great Bulgarian chauvinism" and cracked down on pro-Bulgarian organisations that supported ideas of Greater Bulgaria and those which opposed the Yugoslav idea and insisted on Macedonian independence.

Background
The Balkan Wars in 1912 and 1913, and the World War I (1914-1918) divided the region of Macedonia amongst the Kingdom of Greece, the Kingdom of Bulgaria and the Kingdom of Serbia. The territory was up until that time part of the Ottoman Empire. In those days, the majority of the Slavic speakers in Ottoman Macedonia considered themselves to be a part of the Bulgarian people.

From 1912 until 1915 the territory of Vardar Macedonia remained within the territory of Serbia. In the parts administered by Serbia the new authorities forced out most of the Bulgarian priests and teachers, and began implementing a forceful state-sponsored Serbianisation of Slavic-speaking Macedonians. It was occupied by Kingdom of Bulgaria during World War I between 1915 and 1918. Afterwards it was restored back to Serbia and consequently included as part of the Vardar Banovina in the Kingdom of Yugoslavia. During that period, there were two main autonomist agendas. The right-wing Internal Macedonian Revolutionary Organization (IMRO) led by Ivan Mihailov, was in favor of the creation of a pro-Bulgarian Macedonian state under German and Italian protection.

The leftist IMRO (United) group, who merged with the communists prior to the beginning of the war, favored creation of an independent "Soviet Macedonia" within a Balkan Federation. This option was supported by Pavel Shatev, Dimitar Vlahov, Metodi Shatorov, Panko Brashnarov, and others. However such Macedonian activists, who came from the Bulgarian Communist Party, never managed to get rid of their pro-Bulgarian bias.

During the interwar period in Vardar Macedonia, some young locals repressed by the Serbs, tried to find a separate Macedonian way of national development. Nevertheless, the existence of considerable Macedonian national consciousness prior to the middle of the 1940s is disputed. At that time anti-Serbian and pro-Bulgarian feelings among the local population prevailed.

Occupation of Macedonia

Invasion of Yugoslavia
Fearing an invasion by the Axis Powers, Regent Prince Paul of Yugoslavia signed the Tripartite Pact on 25 March 1941, pledging cooperation with the Axis.

On 27 March, the regime of Prince Paul was overthrown by a military coup d'état with British support. The 17-year-old Peter II of Yugoslavia was declared to be of age and placed in power. General Dušan Simović became his Prime Minister. The Kingdom of Yugoslavia withdrew its support for the Axis de facto without formally renouncing the Pact. On 6 April 1941, the German armed forces (Wehrmacht), along with the armed forces of Italy and Hungary, launched the invasion of the Kingdom of Yugoslavia and quickly conquered it. The country was subsequently divided between the Germans, Italians, Hungarians and Bulgarians, who took most of Macedonia.  When the Bulgarians entered Yugoslav Macedonia, the people greeted them with high enthusiasm. Crowds in Skopje flew banners that greeted the unification of Macedonia and Bulgaria.

Division Macedonian region of southern Yugoslavia
A division of Vardar Macedonia, then part of the Vardar Banovina, was drawn up on 19 and 20 April 1941. Bulgarian troops entered the central and eastern parts and seized most of the banovina, including parts of Eastern Serbia and Kosovo. The most prominent force which occupied most of the area was the 5th Army. The westernmost parts of Macedonia were occupied by the fascist Kingdom of Italy.

Collaborationist organizations
Bulgarian action committees – After the defeat of the Yugoslav army, a group of Macedonian Bulgarians headed by Spiro Kitincev arrived in Macedonia and started preparations for the coming of the Bulgarian army and administration in Macedonia. The first of the Bulgarian Action Committees was formed in Skopje on 13 April 1941. Former IMRO members in Vardar Macedonia were active members of this committee. On 13 April 1941, at a meeting in Skopje, it was decided that one of the first tasks of the newly formed organisation was to regulate the relations with the German authorities. When the Bulgarian Army entered Vardar Macedonia on 19 April 1941, they were greeted by most of the local population as liberators, as anti-Serbian and pro-Bulgarian feelings among the local population prevailed at that time. With the intercession of the committees and Bulgarian administration more than 12,000 Yugoslav Macedonian POWs who had been conscripted into the Yugoslav army were released by German, Italian and Hungarian authorities. With the arrival of the Bulgarian army mass expulsion of Serbian colonists from Vardar Macedonia took place. Once the region and administration became organized, the Action Committees became marginalized, and were ultimately dissolved.

Balli Kombëtar in Macedonia – There were 5,500 Balli Kombëtar militants in Albanian occupied Macedonia, 2,000 of which were Tetovo-based and 500 of which were based in Debar.

Ivan Mihailov's IMRO in Macedonia – After the military Bulgarian coup d'état of 1934 the new Bulgarian government banned IMRO as a terrorist organization. Ivan Mihailov fled to Italy, where he made contact with the Italian fascist authorities and with members of the German secret service (Gestapo). After the defeat of Yugoslavia, Mihailov went to Zagreb and spent the war there with Ante Pavelić. He revitalized parts of his old organisation and ordered them to enter Vardar Macedonia and infiltrate the local Bulgarian administration, waiting for an opportunity to take over control and create a pro-German Macedonian state. Although Nazi Germany gave Bulgaria the right to annex the greater part of Vardar Macedonia, the Gestapo had contacts with Mihailov and his men in Bulgaria and Vardar Macedonia. This was in order to have a "reserve card" in case of things going wrong in Bulgaria.

Serbian Chetnik Movement in Macedonia – There were approximately 8,000 Serb Chetniks led by Draža Mihailović operating in Macedonia during the conflict. For a time, they were controlled by rival Chetnik leader Kosta Pećanac.

Counter-chetas – The Kontračeti were anti-partisan units organized and equipped by the Bulgarian police in the period between 1942 and 1944. Composed of former IMRO-activists, the first kontračeta was formed in Veles in the end of 1942 in order to limit partisan and Serbian Chetnik Movement activities in the region. The idea for the formation of these units came from Stefan Simeonov, chief of the Police in Skopje district, and vormer Internal Dobrujan Revolutionary Organisation četnik, and was approved by minister of the interior Petur Gabrovski. Their peak strength was 200 units in August 1944.

1941

Local resistance under question 
In 1941 the Regional Committee of the Communists in Macedonia was headed by Metodi Shatorov ("Sharlo") from Prilep. After the Bulgarian takeover of Vardarska Banovina in April 1941, the Macedonian communists fell in the sphere of influence of the BCP under Sharlo's leadership. When the directive for the organization of an armed resistance movement in all regions of occupied Yugoslavia was issued, Sharlo disobeyed the order. Sharlo answered the Central Committee (CC) of the CPY that the situation in Macedonia did not allow an immediate engagement with military action, but rather first propaganda activity should occur, and afterward formation of military units. On the other hand, he refused to define the Bulgarian forces as occupiers (contrary to instructions from Belgrade) and called for the incorporation of the local Macedonian Communist organizations into the Bulgarian Communist Party (BCP). The Macedonian Regional Committee refused to remain in contact with CPY and linked up with BCP. Sharlo refused to distribute a proclamation of the YCP which called for military action against Bulgarians.

At that time, the Comintern had a different agenda for the resolution of the fate of Macedonia – an independent Macedonian state governed by a majority population of ethnic Macedonians. This idea was confirmed by the Resolution of the Comintern from 1934, and was supported by the BCP, the Communist Party of Greece (CPG), and the CPY. In 1939 the CPY started promoting the idea of formation of a Macedonian state, but within a Yugoslav federation. Shatorov was opposed to the second option and was a partisan of the Comintern agenda, which proposed a creation of a "Soviet Macedonia". While the Bulgarian Communists avoided organizing mass armed uprising against the Bulgarian authorities, the Yugoslav Communists insisted that no liberation could be achieved without an armed revolt.

First attempts 
Because of this conflict within the RC of CPY in Macedonia, in Vardar Macedonia there was no resistance movement. At the start of World War II, the Comintern supported a policy of non-intervention, arguing that the war was an imperialist war between various national ruling classes. But when the USSR was attacked by Nazi Germany, the Comintern issued a directive ordering the beginning of communist resistance movements in all fascist occupied territories in Europe, so the RC of CPY for Macedonia began organizing resistance in their area. The RC, headed by Shatorov, immediately ordered the formation of partisan units, the first of which was formed in the Skopje region on 22 August 1941, and attacked Bulgarian guards on 8 September 1941 in Bogomila, near Skopje. At that time, with the help of the Comintern and of Joseph Stalin himself a decision was taken and the Macedonian Communists were attached to CPY. Soon after this Shatorov lost his popularity within the CPY and was discredited.

People loyal to the CPY were next appointed as leaders of the RC with Lazar Koliševski as a secretary. He was sent in September in Skopje. The new leadership began formation of partisan detachments. Armed insurgents from the Prilep Partisan Detachment attacked Axis occupied zones in the city of Prilep, notably a Bulgarian police station, on 11 October 1941. This date is considered to be the symbolic beginning of the Macedonian Resistance, which began at the latest compared to the other Yugoslav republics, where it began in July. The Prilep detachment was active until December 1941, when it split in three groups – the first in Skopje, the second in Tikves, and the third in Bitola. However, in November the new leader of the RC - Koliševski was arrested and sentenced to death by a Bulgarian military court. He wrote two appeals for clemency to Bulgarian Tsar and to Defense Minister, insisting on his Bulgarian origin. As result his death sentence was commuted to life imprisonment, and Koliševski was sent to a prison in Pleven, Bulgaria.

1942

Local resistance still under question 

While the Sharlo's leadership was terminated, the vestiges of his policy among part of the local communist activists were preserved. After the arrest of Lazar Koliševski in November, the new executive body of the Macedonian Regional Committee continued to share Shatorov's pro-Bulgarian ideas and re-established close contact with the BCP. Bane Andreev of Veles, a new party secretary for Macedonia, expressed this same ideology. He thought that the Macedonian people believe in Bulgaria's role as liberator and that no Macedonian wants to fight against the Bulgarian soldiers. That the Macedonians should respond positively to the mobilization call being carried out by the Bulgarian authorities and join the Bulgarian army. Tito did not agree with that. During the spring of 1942 Andreev was arrested by Bulgarian police. As a result, a factionalist struggle between the pro-Bulgarian and the pro-Yugoslav lines exacerbated. Thus Cvetko Uzunovski created a provisional regional committee that tried to take over the pro-Bulgarian faction, but without much success. This policy changed from 1943 with the arrival of Tito's envoy Montenegrin Serb Svetozar Vukmanović-Tempo.

Further development 

At the beginning of 1942, several new Partisan detachments were formed. In May 1942 in the village of Lisec, the Veles partisan detachment Pere Toshev was formed. It had three successful battles against the Bulgarian police: on Mount Lisec, in Kriva Krusha, and Vojnica. In July this detachment merged with the newly formed 2nd Prilep detachment under the name Dimitar Vlahov. The detachment had several successful battles on Mount Mukos. In November 1942 in Crveni Steni near Prilep, the 3rd Prilep detachment Gjorce Petrov was formed.

On 22 April 1942 in the village of Lavci, near Bitola, the Pelister detachment was formed. It was involved in several battles against the Bulgarians, but in November it was dispersed as the result of a battle against a much stronger Bulgarian army and police force near Orehovo, when 2/3 of its forces were killed. On 6 June 1942 in the village of Zlatari on Bigla Mountain, the Bitola-Prespa partisan detachment Dame Gruev was formed. This unit engaged in some very successful political agitation and had several military successes, such as an attack on the troops in the village of Smilevo on 2 August 1942, and an attack on the police station in Kažani. In November 1942, the detachment split in three groups – the first remained on Bigla, the second went to northern Prespa, and the third went to southern Prespa. The third group of the Dame Gruev detachment mobilized men from the ethnic Macedonian villages in Mala Prespa and succeeded in liberating territory in Mala Prespa and part of Greek Prespa. This was the first territory liberated by Macedonian partisans during the war.

On 16 April 1942 the Krushevo detachment Pitu Guli was formed which waged several battles against the Bulgarian army and police, the most important of which were the battles in Pribilci, Kocishte and Cer. In September 1942 the 2nd Bitola detachment Jane Sandanski was formed. The fighters of this detachment conducted political speeches in the villages and made sneak attacks on Bulgarian troops such as an attack on the railway station in Beranci in December 1942. In October 1942 the Shar Planina partisan detachment was formed near Tetovo out of Macedonian and Albanian communists. This detachment had success promoting Brotherhood and Unity among the people in Tetovo. In 1942, in the village of Mavrovo, the Mavrovo partisan detachment was formed.

In 1942 a group of young communists from Shtip assembled on Plackovica Mountain in order to form a detachment, but the group was located and destroyed by the Bulgarian police before they could receive their weapons. Groups of communists that were planning to form partisan detachments were arrested due to informants in Strumica and Kočani. The successful actions of the Bulgarian secret police prevented the creation of partisan units in eastern Macedonia in 1942.

Partisan activity was coordinated by the Headquarters of the National Liberation Partisan Detachments of Macedonia (HQ of NLPDM), which was established in July 1942 by Macedonian communists of the CPY and was headed by Mihailo Apostolski.

1943

Support from the CC of the CPY
Although several Macedonian partisan detachments were formed through the end of 1942 which fought battles against the Bulgarian, Italian, German and Albanian occupation forces and despite Sofia's ill-managed administration, most Macedonian Communists had yet to be lured to Yugoslavia. Between 1941 and 1943, Tito have sent five emissaries to Macedonia, to persuade his ill-disciplined comrades, but their efforts had limited success, and the Regional Committee was de facto under the control of the BCP. To change that, at the beginning of 1943 the Montenegrin Svetozar Vukmanović-Tempo was sent as an assistant to the HQ of the Macedonian partisan forces. Tempo tried to organize an energetic struggle against the occupying forces. He was supposed to set up a Macedonian Communist Party within the framework of the Yugoslav one. One of his objectives was to destroy the influence of the BCP in Macedonia and to fight against any form of autonomism. He would have to "Macedonianize" the struggle's form and content, and to give it an ethnic Macedonian facade. One of his main achievements was also that the wartime pro-Bulgarian trend receded into the background of pro-Yugoslav one. Tempo was able to capitalize on the growing contradictions towards Bulgarian authorities, which during 1942 were involved into a policy of centralization, contradicting their initial agenda to respect Macedonian autonomy. Yugoslav communists proclaimed as their aim the issue of unification of the three regions of Macedonia – Yugoslav, Greek and Bulgarian, and so managed to get also Macedonian nationalists.

Formation of the Communist Party of Macedonia (CPM)

The leadership of the Regional Committee of the CPY for Macedonia decided to establish a separate Macedonian Communist Party which would be representative of the will of the Macedonian people in the anti-fascist struggle for national liberation. The Communist Party of Macedonia (CPM) was formed on 19 March 1943 in Tetovo. The first Central Committee (CC of the CPM) was composed as of Yugoslav communists as Strahil Gigov, Kuzman Josifovski Pitu, Cvetko Uzunovski, Mara Naceva and Bane Andreev.

After making a detailed analysis of the military and political situation in the country, the CC of the CPM decided to be directly involved in the fighting and to be stationed side by side with the troops on the battlefield.  The territory of Vardar Macedonia was divided into five operative zones, and efforts were made to make direct contact with the liberation movements in Albania, Bulgaria and Greece.

Adding to the existing eleven, eight new Macedonian partisan detachments were formed in the summer of 1943 as more and more people entered the ranks of the partisans. They managed to create strongholds in the regions of Debarca, Prespa, Kumanovo, Tikvesh, and Gevgelija. This allowed for the expansion of the National Liberation Committees and the creation of larger military units, as decided at a conference in Prespa on 2 August 1943. Regular large military units (battalions and brigades) were created as part of the People's Liberation Army of Macedonia (MNOV). Preparations began for the formation of the Anti-Fascist Assembly for the People's Liberation of Macedonia (ASNOM), which governed Macedonia from August 1944 until the end of World War II.

Formation of the People's Liberation Army of Macedonia

Creation of larger Macedonian military units started immediately after the Prespa conference. The first one to be created was the Mirče Acev Battalion, which was formed on 18 August 1943 on Mount Slavej. On 24 September 1943 on Mount Kožuf the battalion Straso Pindzur was formed, on 30 September the Debar Youth battalion, on 11 November near Bitola the Stiv Naumov battalion, and on 1 December the Kumanovo battalion Orce Nikolov.

On 8 September Italy capitulated. Italian garrisons disarmed by the MNOV included those in Gostivar, Debar, Kicevo and Ljubojno. Some were attacked by units of the MNOV while they were trying to reach the Albanian border and flee Macedonia. The arms and ammunition that were captured gave the opportunity to create new battalions and even brigades. After the disarming of the Italians, a vast territory was liberated which stretched from Gostivar to the north of Struga and Ohrid. The freed territory included the towns Debar and Kicevo.

In the freed territories a provisional people's authority was established, led by the National Liberation Committees. Meetings were being held everywhere propagating the causes of the National Liberation Struggle and the right of Macedonians and other nationalities to self-determination. The first schools in which the Macedonian language was taught were created in this free territory in 1943. The whole population, both male and female, was included in the struggle – the men were mobilized in militias and were given short military training and the women were organized in the Women's Antifascist Front of Macedonia). In October 1943 the HQ of the People's Liberation Army of Macedonia issued a manifesto to the Macedonian people and all other nationalities in Macedonia (as stated in the manifesto: Aromanians, Albanians and Turks) to join the fight of the Macedonian National Liberation Army to win freedom and create a free Socialist Republic of Macedonia. The manifesto also called for struggle against the reactionary Serbian, Albanian and Bulgarian elements (Chetniks, Balli Kombëtar and IMRO agents).

In the middle of 1943, meetings were held between representatives of the National Liberation Front (Greece) and the Albanian resistance. Svetozar Vukmanović-Tempo put forward the idea of a joint Balkan Headquarters to exercise supreme control over the partisan movements in Yugoslavia, Albania, Bulgaria, and Greece. Tempo asked for recognition of the ethnic Macedonian people's right to self-determination, as well as permission for the partisans from Vardar Macedonia to extend their activity among the Slavic-speaking population in Greek Macedonia. As a result, the Slavic-Macedonian National Liberation Front (SNOF) was established in 1943 in Greek Macedonia by ethnic Macedonian communists, members of the Communist Party of Greece (KKE).

On 11 November 1943 in the village of Slivovo the First Macedonian-Kosovo Brigade was formed out of three Macedonian battalions and one battalion from fascist Italian occupied Kosovo. Regions controlled by the partisans now included Debarca, Mavrovo, and Rostuša, within Italy's occupied territory. The activists from Balli Kombëtar and the others Albanian nationalists in western Macedonia suspected that the communist guerrillas were secretly supported by Bulgaria so that the latter could annex the Albanian occupation zone in Macedonia under the pretext of protecting the local population with Bulgarian identity.

Immediately after the establishment of the free territory in western Vardar Macedonia, the German command made an incursion into the areas held by the provisional authority. The problem for the Germans was the fact that the free territory was cutting off communications between Skopje and northeastern Greece. After assembling two divisions and artillery units, the Macedonian forces started operations to re-capture the territory.  The struggle lasted more than two months, with the most important battles being at Buković, Debarca, Kicevo and Slivovo. The town of Kicevo was recaptured by the Germans at the beginning of November, but three days later it once again fell to Macedonian partisan hands, to be later re-captured for the second time by the German troops.

The High Command of the People's Liberation Army of Macedonia together with the Central Committee of the Communist Party of Macedonia decided to take evasive maneuvers in order to avoid total destruction of the Macedonian forces because of the overwhelming number of enemy troops engaged. Only few small units were left behind. After more than two months of constant battles, in December 1943 the Macedonian MNOV together with the CC of the CPM started a massive retreat through Prespa and after a 13-day march entered Greek Macedonia.

Bulgarian actions in 1943 

Bulgaria managed to save its entire 48,000-strong Jewish population during World War II from deportation to Nazi concentration camps, but under German pressure those Jews from their newly annexed territories without Bulgarian citizenship were deported, such as those from Vardar Macedonia and Western Thrace. The Bulgarian government was responsible for the roundup and deportation of over 7,000 Jews in Skopje and Bitola.

The Bulgarian authorities created a special Gendarmerie force which received almost unlimited power to pursue the Communist partisans in the whole kingdom. The gendarmes became notorious for carrying out atrocities against captured partisans and their supporters. Harsh rule by the occupying forces and a number of Allied victories showing that the Axis might lose the war encouraged more Macedonians to support the Communist Partisan resistance movement of Josip Broz Tito.

Many former IMRO members assisted the Bulgarian authorities in fighting Tempo's partisans. With the help of the Bulgarian government and former IMRO members, several pro-Bulgarian paramilitary detachments (Uhrana) were organized in occupied Greek Macedonia in 1943. These were led by Bulgarian officers originally from Greek Macedonia and charged with protecting the local population in the zones under German and Italian control. Around this time Ivan Mihailov of IMRO had plans which envisaged the creation of a Macedonian state under German control. He was a follower of the idea of a united Macedonian state with a dominant Bulgarian element. It was anticipated by the Germans that members of IMRO would form the core of the armed forces of a future Independent Macedonia led by Ivan Mihailov.

1944 and aftermath

February Campaign

After passing through the whole of western Greek Macedonia, the main forces of the People's Liberation Army of Macedonia were stationed in the Almopia region in Greece close to the Yugoslav border. The Partisan detachments that were active in Gevgelia and Tikvesh also crossed the border into northern Greece and met with the main forces of the MNOV. Several meetings were held with members of ELAS and the Greek Communist Party. One of the decisions was the creation of wider partisan detachments composed of the ethnic Macedonian minority in Greece. On 20 December 1943 in the village of Fustani in the Pella district of Greece, the Second Macedonian Assault Brigade was formed out of the 3 battalions of the 3rd operative zone. The Bulgarian Hristo Botev partisan battalion of the MNOV was formed out of captured and escaped Bulgarian soldiers. It was under the command of the HQ of MNOV. The rest of the fighters that were not included in the First Macedonian-Kosovo Assault Brigade and the Second Macedonian Assault Brigade (the Hristo Botev and Stiv Naumov battalion together with several smaller partisan detachments) were organized into the so-called "Third Group of Battalions". The provisional HQ of the reorganized MNOV was stationed in the village of Fustani in the Pella district. Because the massive concentration of MNOV troops in the Moglena district was jeopardizing the Axis communication to Thessaloniki, Bulgarian and German forces launched an incursion against the MNOV in Moglena and at Mount Kozuv. The fighting lasted from 26 December till 18 January. All Axis attacks were repelled, and Mount Kozuf remained a free territory held by the MNOV.

After the fight for Mount Kozuf, the Headquarters of the MNOV decided to launch a three-phase offensive in central and eastern Vardar Macedonia against the fascist occupation forces – known as the "February March". In accordance with the February March plan, on 31 January 1944 the First Macedonian-Kosovo Assault Brigade started marching towards the Veles and Porech regions, but immediately after crossing the border, the Brigade was attacked by two Bulgarian divisions. After constant fighting in cold weather, on 14 February the brigade returned to Greek Macedonia. Although it did not fulfill its mission because of the energetic counter-attacks of the Bulgarians, the First Brigade engaged two divisions of the Bulgarian 5th Army in that region. This opened a gap for the Third Group of Brigades together with CPM and the HQ of MNOV to pass through eastern Macedonia. The Second Macedonian Assault Brigade conducted incursions from 31 January till mid 1944 from Kozuf to Gevgelia and Demir Kapija regions, disrupting the Bulgarian authority in the villages and closing Bulgarian schools. On 31 January the Third Group of Brigades together with the HQ of the MNOV and the CC of the CPM started marching from the village of Zborsko to eastern Vardar Macedonia. 23 days later, after 400 km of travel through five mountain ranges in terrible weather and constant engagements with Bulgarian army units, the Third Group of Battalions was in partisan held territory near Kumanovo. There it made contacts with the forces in Pčinja District and the Bulgarian Resistance. The Hristo Botev battalion, which was until then under the command of the MNOV of Macedonia, was transferred to the Bulgarian resistance command.

The 3rd Battalion Group merged with the two existing Macedonian battalions in Kumanovo region and formed the famous Third Macedonian Assault Brigade in the Kumanovo village of Zegljane on 26 February 1944. After its formation, the Third Macedonian Assault Brigade became the biggest partisan formation in Macedonia and Southern Serbia.

In South Morava, Serbian Chetniks held the terrain, supported by the Germans. The Chetniks prevented the communists from organising in that area. After a meeting in Prohor Pčinjski monastery it was decided the command of the South Moravian and Kosovo partisan detachments would be given to the HQ of MNOV of Macedonia, as it was the most organized and most experienced. The first objective of the HQ of MNOV after the expansion of its command region was the destruction of the Chetnik movement in Macedonia and Pčinja District, starting with the Chetniks stationed in Vardar Macedonia.

Destruction of the Vardar Chetnik Corps

As of 1941, attempts were made to create a Serbian loyalist movement in Vardar Macedonia. A few bands were formed in Veles, Prilep and Strumica, mainly by war veterans and by former Chetnik leaders. These groups were few in numbers, decentralized, and some were formed under their own initiative.  By mid 1942 all of them were destroyed by units of the Bulgarian army. At the beginning of 1943, in order to organize a strong Chetnik force in Vardar Macedonia, and in order to destroy the group influenced by Kosta Pecanac, Draža Mihailović sent in Lieutenant Milivoje Trbić. He quickly organized local committees in Skopje, Veles, Kicevo and Gostivar and started recruiting volunteers among the Serbs of Macedonia. Soon the Vardar Chetnik Corps (VCC) was formed headed by Stojan Krstić (a native of Prilep), which had about 8,000 fighters in Vardar Macedonia.

After the formation of the first battalions of the Macedonian National Liberation Army, the VCC directed all of its efforts to destroying the liberation movement of the Macedonian people. The Porech Chetnik Brigade terrorized the villages that supported the partisans and started conducting forced mobilization. This stimulated anger against the Chetniks and pushed more volunteers into the ranks of the partisan army. In December 1943 the High Command gave Hristijan Todorovski Karpoš the task of destroying the Chetniks in the Skopska Crna Gora region in Skopje and Kozjak in Kumanovo. With detachments from Kumanovo and Skopje, he attacked the Chetniks in three battles, the most important of which occurred near the village of Dragomance at the end of 1943. This battle brought to an end the Chetnik presence in the Kumanovo region. By end of January the Chetniks in Kicevo and Skopska Crna Gora were disarmed by the MNOV. The Porech Chetnik brigade also capitulated, and those fighters entered the ranks of the Porech partisan battalion. After being defeated in Dragomance and Porech, the remaining Chetniks from various scattered brigades merged and concentrated in the Kozjak area on the border with Serbia, where they managed to occupy all of the villages.

The Serbian Chetniks holding the mountain villages in Kozjak presented a real obstacle for the Partisans, depriving them of the strategic mountain areas in their struggle against the Bulgarian army. Also, the Vardar Chetnik Corps started a massive attack on the Partisans, which made the situation even worse.

At the end of January 1944, the High Command of the MNOV decided to launch an offensive, with the intention of destroying the VCC. On 29 February 1944 the partisans of the Third Macedonian Assault Brigade attacked the Chetnik flanks from north, west and south, while the Hristo Botev detachment hit the Chetniks from the east. In the battle for the village of Sejac, the Vardar Chetnik Corps was totally destroyed, suffering 53 casualties (46 shot by partisans and 7 drowned in the river Pčinja while attempting to flee). 97 Chetniks, including 5 officers, were captured in the action. On 3 March 1944 in the village of Novo Selo, Partisan fighters destroyed the remaining force, capturing 30 Chetniks and more than 100 rifles and ammunition. The Serbian Chetniks suffered 12 dead, including Stojan Krstić, their commander. After these decisive battles Draža Mihailović's Chetnik organization ceased to exist as a powerful force in Macedonia. Various local Chetnik bands, decentralized and acting on their own accord, such as the Porech Chetniks, continued to operate in certain parts of Macedonia but they were generally scattered and disorganized.

Actions in northern Vardar Macedonia and south-eastern Serbia

The February March campaign of 1944 had a great political and moral impact. The whole Bulgarian 5th Army, all of the Bulgarian police, as well as the army regiments stationed in Kjustendil and Gorna Dzumaja were engaged in the battles. After the February March, the Bulgarian government was forced to change its strategy – organization of the fighting would no longer be the responsibility of the police but of the army, and all organizations would be obliged to help the army.

After the operations which ended with the destruction of the Chetniks in Macedonia, the HQ of the MNOV, now acting as supreme commander of the partisan units in Vardar Macedonia, Kosovo and South Morava, decided to engage in three new attacks on the Bulgarian police and administration. On 26 April 1944 the Third Macedonian Assault Brigade together with the Kosovo detachment successfully attacked the city of Ristovac, where 130 Bulgarian soldiers were killed and 20 captured by the Macedonian partisans. On 3 April 1944 the 3rd Macedonian Assault Brigade attacked the mining town of Zletovo, where about 100 miners entered the ranks of the brigade.

Spring Offensive

Because of increased partisan activity, the main supply lines for the German Army group "E" stationed in Greece and Albania were constantly ambushed and jeopardized. In order to obtain control over the supply lines and the wider areas around them, the Bulgarian and German armies organized an offensive in Macedonia and south-east Serbia, as part of the Seventh Anti-Partisan Offensive, also known as the Raid on Drvar. In this offensive the occupation authorities mobilised the Bulgarian 5th Army, additional Bulgarian troops from Bulgaria, Chetnik forces from Vlasotince and Leskovac, Greek reactionary PAO units, Albanian Balli Kombëtar from western Macedonia and the whole German garrison from Kilkis, making a total of 60,000 military and administrative personnel in the area.
At the same time, the HQ of the MNOV was making plans to liberate western Macedonia and sent the 1st Macedonian-Kosovo Assault Brigade there. Pushing towards Debarca, the 1st Macedonian-Kosovo Assault Brigade had clashes with the Bulgarians and Germans in Zavoj and Velmej. The Germans obtained reinforcements and on 8 May 1944 they counter-attacked. The fighting ended on 20 May 1944 with the Germans being pushed out of the region. After recapturing the Debarca area, more reinforcements became available, so the brigade was split in two brigades – the 1st Macedonian and 1st Kosovo Assault Brigades. Also, two smaller detachments were formed and charged with the objective of spreading the insurrection in Azot and Porech.

In order to prevent the Germans and Bulgarians from taking total control of the action, the MNOV decided to make surprise attacks on enemy positions and to try to exhaust the enemy any way they could. The 2nd Macedonian Assault Brigade was sent to conduct several actions in Povardarie (central Macedonia) and Pelagonia near Prilep and Bitola. From 25 April until 22 June 1944, the 2nd Macedonian Assault Brigade attacked enemy forces, positions and garrisons at Gradeshnica, Tikveš, Konopishte, Demir Kapija, Strmashevo, Kavadarci and Negotino.

The longest battles were conducted in eastern Macedonia and Pčinja District, where the main German supply lines (Vardar and Morava) and those of the Bulgarians (Skopje-Sofia) were jeopardized. The main forces of the occupying armies were concentrated in that area. This position not only controlled the main communication lines, but positioned them to attack the Macedonian, south Serbian, and Bulgarian resistance movements which were stationed in north-eastern Macedonia. In order to confuse the enemy, the MNOV ordered a surprise attack by the 3rd Macedonian Assault Brigade on the city of Kratovo. After a half-day battle, Kratovo fell into the hands of the partisans. The attack and liberation of Kratovo had a great political and military impact in a time when the Germans and Bulgarians were starting a massive offensive, but it did not stop the Nazis. The 3rd Macedonian Assault Brigade was forced to leave Kratovo three days later, and was involved in many clashes with the Axis armies making while their way 10 km north of Kilkis in Greece. There they rested, reorganized, and started a counter-offensive against the Bulgarians and Germans, battling from Kilkis through eastern Macedonia, passing into Serbia all the way to Crna Trava, where together with the 6th South Moravian Brigade they engaged the enemy in the final battles of this offensive.

In the two months of fighting during the Spring Offensive the Axis forces suffered many casualties. In western Macedonia there were 672 killed and 76 captured Axis soldiers, in central Macedonia (Povardarie) there were 180 killed and 88 captured, in eastern Macedonia and south-eastern Serbia there were over 1,060 killed and 498 captured. A large amount of weapons and ammunition was seized. The newly conscripted men from the freed territories as well as the captured firearms were used to form new brigades and divisions. On 23 July 1944 in Plackovica, the 4th Macedonian Assault Brigade was formed, and was sent to eastern Macedonia in order to make contact with the resistance movement in western Bulgaria.

The 5th Macedonian Assault Brigade was formed at the beginning of August in Porech. One week after its formation it managed to destroy the remains of the Porech Chetniks. In western Macedonia the 6th Macedonian Assault Brigade was formed and was immediately given the assignment of clearing the armed forces of the Balli Kombëtar from western Macedonia. By the end of August four new brigades were formed out of newly recruited volunteers – the 7th, 8th, 9th and 10th Assault Brigades. In the village of Sheshkovo the 1st Macedonian Division was formed out of these new brigades.

ASNOM

On 2 August 1944, on the 41st anniversary of the Ilinden Uprising, the first session of the newly created Anti-Fascist Assembly of the National Liberation of Macedonia (ASNOM) was held at the St. Prohor Pčinjski monastery.

In spite of Tito's hopes to the contrary, the presiding committee of ASNOM was dominated by elements that were not known for their pro-Yugoslav sentiments. To the displeasure of those preferring joining the Yugoslav Socialist Federation, Metodija Andonov-Čento was elected president and Panko Brashnarov (former member of IMRO) vice-president. The assembly tried to secure as much independence as possible for Yugoslav Macedonia and gave priority to the unification of the three parts of Macedonia. Several sources state that Chento had made plans for creating an independent Macedonia which would be backed by the USA.

А manifesto was written outlining the future plans of ASNOM for an independent Macedonian state and declaring the Macedonian language as the official language of Macedonia.

ASNOM was the governing body of Macedonia from its formation until the end of World War II.

"Maximalists" and "Minimalists"

The Manifesto of ASNOM eventually became a compromise between the "maximalists" and the "minimalists" – the unification of the Macedonian people was discussed and propagandized but the decision was ultimately reached that Vardar Macedonia would become a part of the new Communist Yugoslavia.

The proponents of the "maximalist" line were in favor of the creation of an independent United Macedonian state which would have ties with Yugoslavia, but not necessarily inclusion in a Yugoslav Federation. Proponents of this option included Metodija Andonov-Čento, as well as prominent figures of the former IMRO (United) such as Pavel Shatev, Panko Brashnarov, and others. They saw joining Yugoslavia as a form of Serbian dominance over Macedonia, and preferred membership in a Balkan Federation or else complete independence.

Proponents of the "minimalist" line were also for the creation of a Macedonian state, but within the Yugoslavian federation.

These differences were visible in the ASNOM discussions, but they especially came into the open after the final liberation of Macedonia. It must be added that both "maximalist" and "minimalist" lines within the National Liberation Movement in Vardar Macedonia supported the existence of a separate Macedonian identity and were in favor of the creation of a separate state in which the Macedonian people would have their homeland. The greatest difference between the two lines was whether Macedonia should join Yugoslavia, or exist as an independent country.

Failed attempt to create Macedonian puppet state

By August 1944, the Soviet Army was approaching the Balkans. In a last-minute attempt to create a buffer state against the incoming Red Army, on 29 August, the Germans attempted to establish an 'independent' Macedonian puppet state, led by Ivan Mihailov. Unlike the leftist resistance, the right wing followers of IMRO were pro-Bulgarian orientated, and did not support the existence of a future Yugoslavia. The Bulgarian interior minister was put in charge to contact Mihajlov, who at the time was an advisor to Croatia's Nazi leader Ante Pavelić. The state was to receive no military (troops or weapons) backing from Germany, because the Germans were running short on troops and weapons. Telegrams from the time indicate that an orderly Bulgarian-German troop withdrawal would precede the formation of such a puppet state. Bulgaria ordered its troops to withdraw from Macedonia on 2 September. In the evening on 3 September, Ivan Mihailov was flown in first from Zagreb to Sofia, to see what 'can be saved". Two telegrams from 5 September at 1:7 and 6 September at 2:20 relay Hitler's reorder for the establishment of such a state. Mihajlov was transported from Sofia to Skopje in the evening of 5 September. Based on German telegrams from the time, Ivan Mihailov was offered the establishment of such a state, but by 18:00 (6 pm) on 6 September, he declined for inability to gather support. The failure led to ordering German withdrawal from Greece on 6 September and appointing Senior-Field-Commandant for Greece Heinz Scheeuerlen as the new Senior-Field-Commandant for Macedonia. Germany closed its Consulate in Skopje and evacuated its staff together with Ivan Mihailov and his wife out of Macedonia. However, on 8 September, right-wing IMRO nationalists declared independence. The self-proclaimed state was left "virtually defenseless" following the withdrawal of German troops. The Germans did not support it as their forces withdrew from the region. In the chaos, they just tried to use the new-formed  "Macedonian committees" as local police stations. Their members were former activists of Bulgarian Action Committees.

Bulgaria switching sides 

In September 1944 the Soviet Union declared war on Bulgaria and occupied part of the country. A coup d'état on 9 September led to Bulgaria joining the Soviets. A day earlier Bulgaria had declared war on Nazi Germany. This turn of events put Bulgarian divisions stationed in Macedonia in a difficult situation. German troops had closed round them, while their command was being nonplussed by the high treason of some staff officers, who had deserted to the German side. The withdrawing Bulgarian troops in Macedonia fought their way back to the old borders of Bulgaria. Josip Broz formed relations with the new pro-Communist authorities in Bulgaria. After the occupation of Bulgaria by the Soviet army negotiations between Tito and the Bulgarian Communist leaders were organized in September–October 1944, resulting in a military alliance between the Yugoslav forces and Bulgaria. That was followed by demobilization of the Macedonian recruits, who formed as much as 40% – 60% of the soldiers in some Bulgarian battalions. As a result, the Gotse Delchev brigade was set up and equipped in Sofia by the Bulgarian government providing the basis for the deployment of considerable Yugoslav troops in Vardar Macedonia.

Final operations for the liberation of Macedonia

Bulgarian Army 
Under the leadership of the new Bulgarian pro-Soviet government, four Bulgarian armies, 455,000 strong in total, were mobilized and reorganized. By the end of September, the Red Army 3rd Ukrainian Front troops were concentrated at the Bulgarian-Yugoslav border. In the early October 1944 three Bulgarian armies, consisting of around 340,000-man, together with the Red Army reentered occupied Yugoslavia and moved from Sofia to Niš, Skopje and Pristina to blocking the German forces withdrawing from Greece. In Macedonia the Bulgarians operated in conjunction with the fighters of the MNLA, but this cooperation did not proceed without difficulties. From 8 October to 19 November, the Stratsin-Kumanovo operation  was held and Kratovo, Kriva Palanka, Kumanovo and Skopje were taken. At the same time the Bregalnitsa-Strumica operation was led, and the Wehrmacht was driven from the villages of Delchevo, Kočani, Stip, Strumica and Veles. In parallel, the Kosovo operation was also taking a place, aiming to expel the German forces from Kosovo. Southern and Eastern Serbia, Kosovo and Vardar Macedonia were liberated by the end of November. The 3rd Ukrainian Front in collaboration with the People's Liberation Army of Yugoslavia and Bulgarian People's Army carried out the Belgrade Offensive. The 130,000-strong Bulgarian First Army continued to Hungary, driving off the Germans, while the rest moved back to Bulgaria. On a series of maps from Army Group E, showing its withdrawal through Macedonia and Southern Serbia, as well as in the memoirs of its chief of staff, there is almost no indication of Yugoslav Partisan units, but only Bulgarian divisions. Despite these facts, the contribution of Bulgarian troops is still much debated in the Republic of Macedonia for political reasons.

Macedonian partisans

After the German retreat, forced by the Soviet-Bulgarian offensive in Serbia, North Macedonia and Kosovo in the autumn of 1944, the conscription increased significantly. In October 1944 more new brigades were formed: In Veles, Skopje and Kumanovo regions, the new 12th, 16th and 18th Assault Brigades were formed; in eastern Macedonia the 13th, 14th, 19th, 20th and 21st Assault Brigades; and in western Macedonia the 15th Macedonian Assault Brigade. By the end of October 1944 in Vardar Macedonia there were 21 Macedonian, one Kosovar, one Albanian, and the 1st Aegean Macedonian brigade (composed of 1500 armed former Slavic-Macedonian National Liberation Front (SNOF) members that crossed the border into Vardar Macedonia after ELAS ordered the dissolution of their unit). The 1st Macedonian Cavalry Brigade and the 1st Macedonian Automobile Brigade were formed using captured equipment, arms, vehicles, and horses. From August until the beginning of November three Engineering Brigades were formed which started repairing the roads. The new brigades were grouped in six new divisions, which made the total force of the People's Liberation Army of Macedonia three Corps composed of seven divisions, consisting of some 66,000 Macedonian Partisans. By mid-November 1944 the Germans were completely dislodged from Macedonia, and organs of "People's Authority" were established. The German Brigade Angermiler was positioned at the Kačanik Gorge. Skopje was defended by elements of the 22nd Infantry Division and parts of the 11th Luftwaffe Division (which was mainly involved in the fighting in eastern Macedonia), and units from other divisions. Skopje was liberated on 13 November by the 42nd and 50th Macedonian Divisions. After the liberation of Skopje, the HQ of the MNOV sent one artillery and 12 Assault Brigades to western Macedonia, where they enjoyed a decisive victory over the armed forces of the Balli Kombëtar. After fierce fighting, Kicevo was liberated on 16 November, Gostivar on 18 November and Tetovo on 19 November. During these the MNOV killed or captured 13,000 armed Balli Kombëtar troops (about 90% of their forces). On 19 November 1944, with the liberation of Tetovo and Gostivar, the Vardar region of Macedonia was completely liberated. Because of constant clashes with the MNOV the retreat of German Army Group E was blocked for 14 days, and during the final operations for the liberation of Macedonia the German troops had considerable loss of manpower and material: The 22nd Grenadier and 11th Luftwaffe Divisions suffered 10% casualties and a 15% loss of equipment.

Aftermath

Chronological composition by the number of the members of MNLA was as follows:

The total number of casualties in Macedonia from World War II was approximately 24,000, as follows: 7,000 Jews, 6,000 Serbians, 6,000 ethnic Macedonians, 4,000 Albanians and 1,000 Bulgarians. This includes around 3,000  "collaborationists", "counter-revolutionaries" and civilian victims, 7,000 Jews exterminated in concentration camps, and 14,000 resistance fighters and soldiers. According to Bogoljub Kočović the relative number of war losses was the lowest among the Macedonians, compared to the other ethnic groups in Yugoslavia:

According to a Yugoslav census from 1966 on the casualties of the war, the ethnic Macedonian victims were 6,724. They are result from different reasons as follows: 

Despite Bulgaria's significant involvement on the side of the Allies at the end of the war, the country was not cast as a co-fighting country at the Paris Peace Conference, 1946 and was ordered to pay Yugoslavia war reparations for the occupation of Macedonia and Southern Serbia, which Yugoslavia unilaterally abandoned in 1947.

After the war for the first time in history, the Macedonian people managed to obtain their statehood, nation and language. These events marked the defeat of the Bulgarian nationalism and the victory of the Macedonism in the area.

Controversy

Communist repressions

After the liberation the Presidium of the Anti-Fascist Assembly for the People's Liberation of Macedonia (ASNOM), which was the governing body of Macedonia, made several statements and actions that were contradictory to the decisions of the Anti-Fascist Council of the People's Liberation of Yugoslavia (AVNOJ), the Yugoslav executive authority. Tito's General Headquarters sent orders asking the forces of the MNOV to participate in the fighting in the Syrmian Front for the final liberation of Yugoslavia. President Metodija Andonov-Čento and his associates debated whether to send the troops to Srem and help liberate Yugoslavia or to advance the troops under his command toward Greek Macedonia in order to "unify the Macedonian people" into one country. On 16 December, the Gotse Delchev Brigade's artillery platoon stationed at the Skopje Fortress, and one of its infantry platoons at Štip revolted against the order to be sent to the Srem front. They wanted to head to Thessaloniki as presumable capital of an imagined Independent Macedonia. Svetozar Vukmanovic accused them of had fallen under Bulgarian influences. After they refused to disperse on both places, dozens were shot down and many were arrested on his order. Andonov-Čento and his close associates were trying to minimize the ties with Yugoslavia as far as possible, which was contrary to the decisions of AVNOJ. As result Andonov-Čento was replaced by Lazar Kolishevski, who started fully implementing the pro-Yugoslav line. Čento himself was later imprisoned. The fabricated charges against him were of being a Western spy, a traitor working against the SR Macedonia as part of SFR Yugoslavia, being in close contacts with IMRO terrorist, supporting a pro-Bulgarian plan of an Independent Macedonia, etc.

The new leadership of the People's Republic of Macedonia headed by Lazar Kolishevski confirmed the decisions of AVNOJ, and Macedonia joined Yugoslavia.  Bosnia and Herzegovina, Croatia, Macedonia, Montenegro, Serbia, and Slovenia eventually all became part of the Socialist Federal Republic of Yugoslavia . The Macedonian national feelings were already ripe at that time as compared to 1941. Subsequently, to wipe out the remaining bulgarophile sentiments, the new Communist authorities persecuted the right-wing nationalists with the charges of "great-Bulgarian chauvinism". The next task was also to break up all the organisations that opposed the idea of Yugoslavia. So even older left-wing politicians, who were at some degree pro-Bulgarian oriented, were purged from their positions, then isolated, arrested and imprisoned on fabricated charges, as foreign agents, demanding greater independence, forming of conspirative political groups and the like. Besides, many people went throughout the labor camp of Goli Otok in the middle 1940s. The number of the victims is estimated from 50 000, up to 100 000 including those killed, imprisoned, deported, sent to forced labor, tortured, etc.

Manipulation of historical events
 

By their invasion in 1941, the Bulgarians were greeted by most of the locals as liberators from Serbian rule, through waving Bulgarian flags, because pro-Bulgarian sentiments among them still prevailed. Macedonian communists then also refused to define the Bulgarians as occupiers and incorporated their structures into the BCP. At the same time sizable part of the local administration, the soldiers recruited in the Bulgarian Army and the police officers stationed in Vardar Macedonia were native from the area. Even the only victim of the attack on 11 October 1941, celebrated today as the day of the Macedonian Uprising against fascism, was a local man conscripted in the Bulgarian police. Yugoslav Macedonian historians have accused the Bulgarian forces of several atrocities, most prominent among which is the massacre of 12 young civilians at the village of Vataša, but the officer commanding the operation was also a local staff. However, after the war, the Yugoslav communist historiography did a lot to equate the term Bulgarians with "fascistic occupiers". Today are some revisionist opinions in North Macedonia, this conflict was merely a civil war, and the significant resistance movement against the Bulgarians is only a historical myth. The number of ethnic Macedonian partisans killed from October 1941 to October 1944 in direct battles against Bulgarians is only several dozens. Indicative of the attitude of the locals towards the Bulgarians is a case which is still a taboo topic in North Macedonia. In October 1944, 25 Bulgarian soldiers captured by the Germans managed to escape and hid in the city of Ohrid. Despite threats that the city would come under artillery fire from the Germans, the soldiers were not handed over by the citizens. Subsequently, the Germans set a condition for a ransom of 12 kg. gold. To accomplish this, even a gold cross was removed from the roof of a local church. Strongly impressed by this act, the Germans refused to take the gold and to look for the fugitives further and left the city. Thus the soldiers were saved.

On the other hand, the glorification of the Yugoslav Partisan movement became one of the main components of the post-war communist political propaganda. Despite that, before the autumn of 1944, the Macedonian Partisans were not significant military force. Their activity did not differ from the typically Balkan "hajduk" traditions as ambushes and lack of military planning. They were ill-equipped and did not have good training. The Partisans received more weapons after the coup d'état of 9 September 1944 as the Bulgarians withdrew from the area and part of their military equipment fell into Partisans' hands. Simultaneously they counted hardly ca. 8,000-man, based predominantly on then Albanian territory. It became clear in the autumn of 1944, that the Bulgarian army supporting the Belgrade Offensive of the 3rd Ukrainian Front, was the real force behind the driving the German Army Group E, counting ca. 300,000 soldiers, out of Southern Serbia, Kosovo and Macedonia. Nevertheless, the official Yugoslav and later Macedonian historiography, has played down its role by political grounds, actually at the cost of historical deceptions. 

For example, according to Macedonian sources Bulgarians did not participate in the operations for the capture of Skopje in the mid of November 1944, even as observers. Once the city was seized by the guerrillas, they were not even allowed to enter it. Nevertheless, the city was seized not without the decisive role of the Bulgarian troops. Per German military historian Karl Hnilicka, the Bulgarians developed their advance towards Skopje into a large-scale offensive, which gave rise to the danger for Army Group E of being cut off. The situation was desperate and the town was evacuated urgently at the night of 13/14 November. As result on 13 and 14 November parts of the First and Fourth Bulgarian Armies entered Skopje. According to the British commissioner in the Allied Commission in Sofia — general Walter Oxley, Skopje was seized after several Bulgarian attacks, while the partisans were waiting on the hills around, but they moved on in time to support the Bulgarian entry into the city. Bulgarian sources maintain at first they entered the town, and namely Bulgarian detachments seized also its center at midnight.

Subsequently, a lot of Partisan monuments and memorials were built in SR Macedonia. Meanwhile, ca. 3,000 Bulgarian victims buried in different cemeteries in Yugoslavia, were collected in two ossuaries – in Nis and in Vukovar. The rest from the military cemeteries, including all of them in North Macedonia, were obliterated. Some of the Bulgarian victims were returned and buried in Bulgaria. In general 3,422 Bulgarian soldiers were killed and 2,136 were missing in the autumn of 1944 in Southern Serbia, North Macedonia and Kosovo.

Modern references

Nowadays, indicative in this respect is the 2016 Macedonian film The Liberation of Skopje, where compared with the Bulgarians, who move through the town like gangsters, the Nazis are gentlemen. According to the Bulgarian Association for Research and Development of Civil Society, the movie, which is sponsored by the Macedonian government, is part of its propagandist agenda and breeds anti-Bulgarian hatred. Another issue is the 2012 movie The Third Half inspired by the tragic fate of the deported Jewish population in Macedonia, with the Bulgarians presented as the true Nazis rather than the Germans themselves. Bulgarian members of the European Parliament—expressed outrage over the film and claimed it was an attempt to manipulate the Balkan history and to spread hate against Bulgaria. They have insisted the Macedonian government has overdone with its nationalist activities. In October 2019 the Bulgarian government has set tough terms for North Macedonia's EU candidature and part of them are to remove the phrase "Bulgarian fascistic occupiers" from all World War II historical landmarks, as well as to begin the rehabilitation of all people who suffered under former Yugoslav communist rule because of their Bulgarian identity. Sofia insists also the two countries must "harmonize"  historic literature  "overcoming the hate speech" against Bulgaria. In November 2020 Bulgaria blocked the official start of EU accession talks with North Macedonia. In an interview with Bulgarian media in the same month, the Prime Minister Zoran Zaev acknowledged the involvement of Bulgarian troops in the capture of Skopje and other Macedonian towns, that Bulgarians were not fascist occupiers, as well as many other historical facts that have been altered and concealed for decades in North Macedonia. The interview was a shock and was followed by a wave of hysterical nationalism in Skopje as well by protests demanding Zaev's resignation. According to the opinion of the former Macedonian Prime Minister Ljubčo Georgievski, these reactions are organized by the post-Yugoslav deep state, and are the result of ignorance, hypocrisy or politicking. On the other hand, another former Prime Minister Vlado Buckovski, reacted that Macedonians and Bulgarians were a single people, finally separated intentionally by the Yugoslav policy after the WWII.

See also 
 List of World War II monuments and memorials in the Republic of Macedonia
 Bulgarian resistance movement during World War II
 Anti-partisan operations in World War II
 Seven anti-Partisan offensives
 Macedonian Question
 Military history of Albania during World War II
 Military history of Bulgaria during World War II
 Military history of Germany during World War II
 Military history of Italy during World War II
 Military history of the Republic of Macedonia
 Timeline of World War II
 Titoism

References

Sources

External links

Comprehensive historic overview
 Macedonia During World War II

Miscellaneous
 Im Schatten des Krieges. Besatzung oder Anschluss – Befreiung oder Unterdrückung?. Eine komparative Untersuchung über die bulgarische Herrschaft in Vardar-Makedonien 1915–1918 und 1941–1944 Reihe: Studien zur Geschichte, Kultur und Gesellschaft Südosteuropas Jahr: 2005 
 "Ko čelik sme nie" – Battle March of the Third Macedonian Schock Brigade (composed by Panče Pešev and written by Aco Šopov) 

 
 Macedonia
Communism in North Macedonia
Yugoslav Macedonia
Civil wars
History of North Macedonia
Yugoslav Macedonia
Conflicts in 1941
Conflicts in 1942
Conflicts in 1943
Conflicts in 1944
1941 in Yugoslavia
1942 in Yugoslavia
1943 in Yugoslavia
1944 in Yugoslavia
 World War II